Mission Township is a township in Neosho County, Kansas, in the United States.

Mission Township was organized in 1871.

References

Townships in Neosho County, Kansas
Townships in Kansas